Purpuricenus is a genus of beetles in the family Cerambycidae, containing the following species:

 Purpuricenus axillaris Haldeman, 1847
 Purpuricenus dimidiatus LeConte, 1884
 Purpuricenus humeralis (Fabricius, 1798)
 Purpuricenus laetus (Thomson, 1864)
 Purpuricenus linsleyi Chemsak, 1961
 Purpuricenus opacus (Knull, 1937)
 Purpuricenus paraxillaris MacRae, 2000
 Purpuricenus sanguinolentus (Olivier, 1795)

References

Trachyderini
Cerambycidae genera